Alone Too Long may refer to:

Alone Too Long (album), a 1977 Tommy Flanagan recording
"Alone Too Long" (song), a Hall & Oates composition